Eloise Lownsbery (April 16, 1888 – November 1, 1967) was the recipient of a Newbery Honor in 1932, for her book Out of the Flame. Lownsbey was raised in Paw Paw, Illinois by her parents, Alexander W. and Martha Fisher Lownsbery. She obtained her B.A. degree in 1911 at Wellesley College in Wellesley, Massachusetts, and  continued on to publish her first book The Boy Knight of Reims.

References

People from Paw Paw, Illinois
Wellesley College alumni
1888 births
1967 deaths
Newbery Honor winners
American children's writers
American women children's writers